I See Ice is a 1938 British comedy film directed by Anthony Kimmins and starring George Formby, Kay Walsh and Betty Stockfeld. The film depicts the adventures of a photographer working for a London newspaper. It features the songs "In My Little Snapshot Album", "Noughts And Crosses" and "Mother What'll I Do Now".

Plot
The farcical adventures of a prop man (George Formby) with a touring ice ballet. Inventing a new sort of candid camera in his spare time, and concealing it in a bow-tie, our hero gets into a mess of trouble when he takes an incriminating photo of an important man; pulls a communication cord; winds up in jail; referees a hockey match; finds himself in a stage show dressed as a cossack; woos an attractive young ice skater (Kay Walsh); and eventually wins a job on a newspaper.

Cast
 George Formby as George Bright
 Kay Walsh as Judy Gaye
 Cyril Ritchard as Paul Martine
 Betty Stockfeld as Mrs. Hunter
 Garry Marsh as Galloway
 Frederick Burtwell as Detective
 Ernest Sefton as Outhwaite
 Gavin Gordon as Night Club Singer
 Ernest Jay as Theater Manager
 Andreas Malandrinos as Lotus Club Manager
 Gordon McLeod as Lord FeiMead
 Archibald Batty as Colonel Hunter
 Elliott Mason as Mother on Train
 Roddy McDowall (age 9) uncredited - Child on train

Critical reception
 Hal Erickson wrote in Allmovie that although the film is "well directed and exceptionally well cast (Kay Walsh and Cyril Ritchard appear in support), I See Ice wouldn't amount to a hill of beans without the presence of the ebullient Formby, who halts the action every once in a while for one of his unsubtly risque comic songs. Not surprisingly, the film was infinitely more popular as a "regional" than as a big-city attraction"/
 Halliwell's Film Guide wrote, "fair star comedy with good production".
 TV Guide wrote, " wild little comedy with Formby performing uproariously as usual."

References

Bibliography
 Low, Rachael. Filmmaking in 1930s Britain. George Allen & Unwin, 1985.
 Perry, George. Forever Ealing. Pavilion Books, 1994.
 Wood, Linda. British Films, 1927–1939. British Film Institute, 1986.

External links

1938 films
Films directed by Anthony Kimmins
1938 musical comedy films
British musical comedy films
Films set in London
Associated Talking Pictures
British black-and-white films
1930s English-language films
1930s British films